Kosman is a surname. Notable people with the surname include:

Admiel Kosman (born 1957), Israeli poet and Talmudist
Aryeh Kosman (1935–2021), American philosopher
Marceli Kosman (born 1940), Polish historian
Mike Kosman (1917–2002), American baseball player

See also
Kossmann